A nocebo effect is said to occur when negative expectations of the patient regarding a treatment cause the treatment to have a more negative effect than it otherwise would have. For example, when a patient anticipates a side effect of a medication, they can experience that effect even if the "medication" is actually an inert substance. The complementary concept, the placebo effect, is said to occur when positive expectations improve an outcome. The nocebo effect is also said to occur in someone who falls ill owing to the erroneous belief that they were exposed to a toxin i.e. SARS-CoV-2 vaccine adulterants, or to a physical phenomenon they believe is harmful, such as EM radiation.

Both placebo and nocebo effects are presumably psychogenic, but they can induce measurable changes in the body. One article that reviewed 31 studies on nocebo effects reported a wide range of symptoms that could manifest as nocebo effects, including nausea, stomach pains, itching, bloating, depression, sleep problems, loss of appetite, sexual dysfunction, and severe hypotension.

Etymology and usage
Kennedy emphasized that his use of the term nocebo refers strictly to a subject-centered response, a quality inherent in the patient rather than in the remedy". That is, Kennedy rejected the use of the term for pharmacologically induced negative side effects such as the ringing in the ears caused by quinine. That is not to say that the patient's psychologically induced response may not include physiological effects. For example, an expectation of pain may induce anxiety, which in turn causes the release of cholecystokinin, which facilitates pain transmission.

Response
In the narrowest sense, a nocebo response occurs when a drug-trial subject's symptoms are worsened by the administration of an inert, sham, or dummy (simulator) treatment, called a placebo. According to current pharmacological knowledge and the current understanding of cause and effect, a placebo contains no chemical (or any other agent) that could possibly cause any of the observed worsening in the subject's symptoms. Thus, any change for the worse must be due to some subjective factor. Adverse expectations can also cause the analgesic effects of anesthetic medications to disappear.

The worsening of the subject's symptoms or reduction of beneficial effects is a direct consequence of their exposure to the placebo, but those symptoms have not been chemically generated by the placebo. Because this generation of symptoms entails a complex of "subject-internal" activities, in the strictest sense, we can never speak in terms of simulator-centered "nocebo effects", but only in terms of subject-centered "nocebo responses". Although some observers attribute nocebo responses (or placebo responses) to a subject's gullibility, there is no evidence that an individual who manifests a nocebo/placebo response to one treatment will manifest a nocebo/placebo response to any other treatment; i.e., there is no fixed nocebo/placebo-responding trait or propensity.

McGlashan, Evans & Orne found no evidence in 1969 of what they termed a placebo personality. Also, in a carefully designed study, Lasagna, Mosteller, von Felsinger and Beecher in 1954, found that there was no way that any observer could determine, by testing or by interview, which subject would manifest a placebo reaction and which would not. Experiments have shown that no relationship exists between an individual's measured hypnotic susceptibility and their manifestation of nocebo or placebo responses.

Based on a biosemiotic model (2022), Goli explains how harm and/or healing expectations lead to a multimodal image and form transient allostatic or homeostatic interoceptive feelings, demonstrating how repetitive experiences of a potential body induce epigenetic changes and form new attractors, such as nocebos and placeboes, in the actual body.

Effects

Side effects of drugs
It has been shown that, due to the nocebo effect, warning patients about side effects of drugs can contribute to the causation of such effects, whether the drug is real or not. This effect has been observed in clinical trials: according to a 2013 review, the dropout rate among placebo-treated patients in a meta-analysis of 41 clinical trials of Parkinson's disease treatments was 8.8%. A 2013 review found that nearly 1 out of 20 patients receiving a placebo in clinical trials for depression dropped out due to adverse events, which were believed to have been caused by the nocebo effect. A 2018 review found that half of patients taking placebos in clinical trials report intervention-related adverse events.

In January 2022, a systematic review and meta-analysis concluded that nocebo responses accounted for 72% of adverse effects after the first COVID-19 vaccine dose and 52% after the second dose.

Many studies show that the formation of nocebo responses are influenced by inappropriate health education, media work, and other discourse makers who induce health anxiety and negative expectations.

Electromagnetic hypersensitivity
Evidence suggests that the symptoms of electromagnetic hypersensitivity are caused by the nocebo effect.

Pain
Verbal suggestion can cause hyperalgesia (increased sensitivity to pain) and allodynia (perception of a tactile stimulus as painful) as a result of the nocebo effect. Nocebo hyperalgesia is believed to involve the activation of cholecystokinin receptors.

Ambiguity of medical usage
Stewart-Williams and Podd argue that using the contrasting terms "placebo" and "nocebo" to label inert agents that produce pleasant, health-improving, or desirable outcomes versus unpleasant, health-diminishing, or undesirable outcomes (respectively), is extremely counterproductive. For example, precisely the same inert agents can produce analgesia and hyperalgesia, the first of which, from this definition, would be a placebo, and the second a nocebo.

A second problem is that the same effect, such as immunosuppression, may be desirable for a subject with an autoimmune disorder, but be undesirable for most other subjects. Thus, in the first case, the effect would be a placebo, and in the second, a nocebo. A third problem is that the prescriber does not know whether the relevant subjects consider the effects that they experience to be desirable or undesirable until some time after the drugs have been administered. A fourth problem is that the same phenomena are being generated in all the subjects, and these are being generated by the same drug, which is acting in all of the subjects through the same mechanism. Yet because the phenomena in question have been subjectively considered to be desirable to one group but not the other, the phenomena are now being labelled in two mutually exclusive ways (i.e., placebo and nocebo); and this is giving the false impression that the drug in question has produced two different phenomena.

Ambiguity of anthropological usage
Some people maintain that belief kills (e.g., voodoo death: Cannon in 1942 describes a number of instances from a variety of different cultures) and belief heals (e.g., faith healing). A self-willed death (due to voodoo hex, evil eye, pointing the bone procedure, etc.) is an extreme form of a culture-specific syndrome or mass psychogenic illness that produces a particular form of psychosomatic or psychophysiological disorder which results in a psychogenic death. Rubel in 1964 spoke of "culture bound" syndromes, which were those "from which members of a particular group claim to suffer and for which their culture provides an etiology, diagnosis, preventive measures, and regimens of healing".

Certain anthropologists, such as Robert Hahn and Arthur Kleinman, have extended the placebo/nocebo distinction into this realm in order to allow a distinction to be made between rituals, like faith healing, that are performed in order to heal, cure, or bring benefit (placebo rituals) and others, like "pointing the bone", that are performed in order to kill, injure or bring harm (nocebo rituals). As the meaning of the two inter-related and opposing terms has extended, we now find anthropologists speaking, in various contexts, of nocebo or placebo (harmful or helpful) rituals:
 that might entail nocebo or placebo (unpleasant or pleasant) procedures;
 about which subjects might have nocebo or placebo (harmful or beneficial) beliefs;
 that are delivered by operators that might have nocebo or placebo (pathogenic, disease-generating or salutogenic, health-promoting) expectations;
 that are delivered to subjects that might have nocebo or placebo (negative, fearful, despairing or positive, hopeful, confident) expectations about the ritual;
 which are delivered by operators who might have nocebo or placebo (malevolent or benevolent) intentions, in the hope that the rituals will generate nocebo or placebo (lethal, injurious, harmful or restorative, curative, healthy) outcomes; and, that all of this depends upon the operator's overall beliefs in the harmful nature of the nocebo ritual or the beneficial nature of the placebo ritual.

Yet it may become even more terminologically complex, for as Hahn and Kleinman indicate, there can also be cases where there are paradoxical nocebo outcomes from placebo rituals, as well as paradoxical placebo outcomes from nocebo rituals (see also unintended consequences). Writing from his extensive experience of treating cancer (including more than 1,000 melanoma cases) at Sydney Hospital, Milton in 1973 warned of the impact of the delivery of a prognosis, and how many of his patients, upon receiving their prognosis, simply turned their face to the wall and died a premature death: "there is a small group of patients in whom the realization of impending death is a blow so terrible that they are quite unable to adjust to it, and they die rapidly before the malignancy seems to have developed enough to cause death. This problem of self-willed death is in some ways analogous to the death produced in primitive peoples by witchcraft ('pointing the bone')".

Ethics
A number of researchers have pointed out that the harm caused by communicating with patients about potential treatment adverse events raises an ethical issue. In order to respect autonomy, one is required to inform a patient about what harms a treatment is likely to cause. Yet the way in which potential harms are communicated could cause additional harm, which may violate the ethical principle of non-maleficence. It may be possible that nocebo effects can be reduced while respecting autonomy using different models of informed consent, including the use of a framing effect and the authorized concealment. In fact, it has been argued that forcing patients to learn about all potential adverse events against their will could violate autonomy.

See also

Notes

References

External links

 Nocebo and nocebo effect
 The nocebo response
 The Nocebo Effect: Placebo's Evil Twin
  What modifies a healing response
 The science of voodoo: When mind attacks body, New Scientist
 The Effect of Treatment Expectation on Drug Efficacy: Imaging the Analgesic Benefit of the Opioid Remifentanil
 This Video Will Hurt (The Nocebo Effect), via YouTube
 BBC Discovery program on the nocebo effect
 What is the Nocebo effect?

Clinical research
Cultural anthropology
Drug discovery
1960s neologisms
Latin medical words and phrases
Medical terminology
Medicinal chemistry
Mind–body interventions
Somatic psychology